Tar Aik Bong is the chairman of the Palaung State Liberation Front (PSLF), and the commander in chief of an insurgent group in Myanmar called Ta'ang National Liberation Army (TNLA). He is of Ta'ang (Palaung) descent.

Insurgent activity 
Tar Aik Bong was originally part of the Palaung State Liberation Organization/Army (PSLO/A), until they signed a ceasefire agreement with the government in 1991. After the dissolution of the PSLO/A, Tar Aik Bong and another Ta'ang leader, Tar Bone Kyaw, founded the TNLA alongside the PSLF to continue fighting for the self-determination of the Ta'ang people.

References

Burmese military personnel
Living people
Burmese rebels
Date of birth missing (living people)
Place of birth missing (living people)
Year of birth missing (living people)

Burmese warlords